MNP Tower, formerly known as 101 Street Tower, is an office tower in Edmonton, Alberta, Canada. It stands at 118 metres (387 feet) or 29 stories tall and was completed in 1978. Tenants include MNP LLP, Longview Systems, MLT Aikins LLP, Emery Jamieson LLP, and SNC Lavalin.

The building was originally developed by Oxford Properties as part of a larger complex with the current Oxford Tower (formerly City Centre Place), Edmonton City Centre (mall), TD Tower and the Delta Edmonton Centre Suite Hotel, all of which are linked by the Edmonton Pedway to each other and to the Edmonton Light Rail Transit system.

In 2016 MNP Tower was awarded The Outstanding Building of the Year Award from the Building Owners and Managers Association (BOMA), Edmonton chapter.

See also
List of tallest buildings in Edmonton
MNP LLP

References

External links
 Oxford Tower Emporis profile

Skyscraper office buildings in Canada
Buildings and structures in Edmonton
Skyscrapers in Edmonton
Towers in Alberta
Oxford Properties
Office buildings completed in 1978